The 10th Pan American Games were held in Indianapolis, United States from 7 to 23 August 1987. Grenada made its Pan Am Games debut at this edition of the multi-sport event.

Results by event

See also
Grenada at the 1988 Summer Olympics

References

Nations at the 1987 Pan American Games
Pan American Games
1987